The economy of Malawi is $7.522 billion by gross domestic product as of 2019, and is predominantly agricultural, with about 80% of the population living in rural areas. The landlocked country in south central Africa ranks among the world's least developed countries. In 2017, agriculture accounted for about one-third of GDP and about 80% of export revenue. The economy depends on substantial inflows of economic assistance from the IMF, the World Bank, and individual donor nations. The government faces strong challenges: to spur exports, to improve educational and health facilities, to face up to environmental problems of deforestation and erosion, and to deal with the problem of HIV/AIDS in Africa. Malawi is a least developed country according to United Nations.

Agriculture

Malawi's most important export crop is tobacco, which accounted for a third (30%) of export revenue in 2012. In 2000, the country was the tenth-largest producer in the world. The country's heavy reliance on tobacco places a heavy burden on the economy as world prices decline and the international community increases pressure to limit tobacco production. Malawi's dependence on tobacco is growing, with the product jumping from 53% to 70% of export revenues between 2007 and 2008.

The country also relies heavily on tea, sugarcane and coffee, with these three plus tobacco making up more than 90% of Malawi's export revenue. Tea was first introduced in 1878. Most of it is grown in Mulanje and Thyolo. Other crops include cotton, corn, potatoes, sorghum, cattle and goats. Tobacco and sugar processing are notable secondary industries.

Traditionally Malawi has been self-sufficient in its staple food, maize (corn), and during the 1980s it exported substantial quantities to its drought-stricken neighbors. Nearly 90% of the population engages in subsistence farming. Smallholder farmers produce a variety of crops, including maize, beans, rice, cassava, tobacco, and groundnuts (peanuts). Financial wealth is generally concentrated in the hands of a small elite. Malawi's manufacturing industries are situated around the city of Blantyre.

Lake Malawi and Lake Chilwa provide most of the fish for the region. For many Malawians, fish is the most important source of proteins. Dried fish is not only consumed locally, but also exported to neighboring countries. Most fishing is done on small scale by hand. However, Maldeco Fisheries owns several commercial fishing boats and operates fish farms in the southern part of Lake Malawi.

Malawi has few exploitable mineral resources. A South-African Australian consortium exploits uranium at a mine near Karonga. Coal is being extracted in Mzimba District. Malawi's economic reliance on the export of agricultural commodities renders it particularly vulnerable to external shocks such as declining terms of trade and drought. High transport costs, which can comprise over 30% of its total import bill, constitute a serious impediment to economic development and trade. Malawi must import all its fuel products. Other challenges include a paucity of skilled labor, difficulty in obtaining expatriate employment permits, bureaucratic red tape, corruption, and inadequate and deteriorating road, electricity, water, and telecommunications infrastructure which hinder economic development in Malawi. However, recent government initiatives targeting improvements in the road infrastructure, together with private sector participation in railroad and telecommunications, have begun to render the investment environment more attractive.

The following are Malawi's top 20 agricultural production values and volumes for 2009. (Unofficial figures derived from FAO statistics) 

Key:
F : FAO estimate, Im: FAO data based on imputation methodology, P : Provisional official data

Macro-economic trends
The following table shows the main economic indicators in 1980–2017.

Industry
In 2013, Malawi's manufacturing sector contributed 10.7% of GDP. The main industries are food processing, construction, consumer goods, cement, fertilizer, ginning, furniture production and cigarette production.

The government's attempts to diversify the agriculture sector and move up the global value chain have been seriously constrained by poor infrastructure, an inadequately trained work force and a weak business climate. In order to help companies adopt innovative practices and technologies, the National Export Strategy adopted in 2013 affords companies greater access to the outcome of international research and better information about available technologies; it also helps companies to obtain grants to invest in such technologies from sources such as the country's Export Development Fund and the Malawi Innovation Challenge Fund. In parallel, the government has raised its investment in research and development to 1% of GDP.

Food and beverages
Most fruits and vegetables are exported raw, while processed food is imported mainly from South Africa.  Carlsberg opened its first brewery outside of Denmark in Blantyre in 1965. The brewery also bottles Coca-Cola products under licence.  A mango processing plant for the export of fruit concentrate opened in Salima in 2013. Universal Industries operates several food factories in Blantyre, where it produces sweets, crisps, biscuits, milk powder, soy products and baby food. Coffee and tea are processed by half a dozen of different companies in the regions of Thyolo, Mulanje and around Mzuzu.

Pharmaceutical companies 
Malawi has four pharmaceutical companies. They manufacture a limited range of drugs, particularly those that are in great demand on the local market. These are Pharmanova Ltd., which is the biggest pharmaceutical manufacturer in Malawi, followed by SADM, Malawi Pharmacies (Pharmaceuticals Limited) and Kentam Products Limited.

Forestry

Large man-made pine tree forests are located in the Viphya Mountains, around Mulanje and Zomba. Timber production for building materials and furniture is an important industry for these regions. However, most areas in Malawi suffer from deforestation due to illegal logging for charcoal production and the use of firewood.

Electricity
Malawi's sole power supplier is the state owned Electricity Supply Commission of Malawi (ESCOM), which generates almost all its power from hydroelectric plants along the Shire River. The installed is approximately 351MW. About 12% of the country's population has access to electricity, according to 2014 World Bank figures.

The country has been suffering from intermittent power outages as a result of an ongoing drought that has halved power output as water levels of the Shire river dropped significantly. The river usually generates 300MW of electricity, accounting for 98% of Malawi's total supply. However, the drought reduced that capacity to 160MW, according to ESCOM.

Services
The service sector accounts for 51.7% of Malawi's national GDP. Notable industries are tourism, retail, transport, education, health services, telecommunication and the banking sector.  The Government of Malawi holds shares in many important companies, such as Malawian Airlines (51%) and Press Corporation Limited. Press Corporation Ltd. is the country's biggest company, with subsidiaries in the tobacco, banking, sugar, fishing, ethanol production, steel production, retail, telecommunication and petrol sectors.

International support
Malawi has undertaken economic structural adjustment programs supported by the World Bank (IBRD), the International Monetary Fund (IMF), and other donors since 1981. Broad reform objectives include stimulation of private sector activity and participation through the elimination of price controls and industrial licensing, liberalization of trade and foreign exchange, rationalization of taxes, privatization of state-owned enterprises, and civil service reform. Malawi qualified for Heavily Indebted Poor Country (HIPC) debt relief and is in the process of refining its poverty reduction strategy.

Malawi has bilateral trade agreements with its two major trading partners, South Africa and Zimbabwe, both of which allow duty-free entry of Malawian products into their countries. The government faces challenges such as the improvement of Malawi's educational and health facilities — particularly important because of the rising rates of HIV/AIDS — and environmental problems including deforestation, erosion, and overworked soils.

Move towards economic independence
In 2006, in response to disastrously low agricultural harvests, Malawi, through an initiative by the late President Bingu Mutharika, an economist by profession, began a program of fertilizer subsidies that were designed to re-energize the land and boost crop production. It has been reported that this program, championed by the country's president, is radically improving Malawi's agriculture, and causing Malawi to become a net exporter of food to nearby countries.

Economic grievances though took a downward slide during Mutharika's second term. Economic grievances were a catalyst that resulted in the 2011 economic protests in Malawi in July.

Economic indicators
The following figures are taken from the CIA World Factbook, unless otherwise indicated.

GDP:
purchasing power parity = $22.37 billion (2017 est.)

GDP - real growth rate:
4% (2017 est.)

GDP - per capita:
purchasing power parity - $1200 (2017 est.)

GDP - composition by sector:
agriculture:
28.1%
industry:
15.8%
services:
56.1% (2016 est.)

Population below poverty line:
50.7% (2010 est.)

Inflation rate (consumer prices):
23% (2014 est.)

Labor force:
7 million (2013 est.)

Labor force - by occupation:
agriculture 76.9%, industry and services 23.1% (2013 est.)

Unemployment rate:
NA%

Budget:
revenues:
$1.346 billion (2017 est.)
expenditures:
$1.556 billion (2017 est.)

Public Debt
59.3% of GDP (2017 est.)

Industries:
tobacco, tea, sugar, sawmill products, cement, consumer goods, cotton, consumer goods, uranium and coal mining

Industrial production growth rate:
2.8% (2013 est.)

Electricity - production:
1.973 billion kWh (2010 est.)

Electricity - consumption:
1.835 billion kWh (2010 est.)

Agriculture - products:
tobacco, sugar cane, cotton, tea, maize, potatoes, cassava (tapioca), sorghum, pulses; cattle, goats

Exports:
$1.427 billion (2013 est.)

Exports - commodities:
tobacco, tea, sugar, cotton, coffee, peanuts, wood products, apparel, uranium and its compounds

Exports - partners:
Canada 10.6%, Zimbabwe 9.3%, Germany 7.3%, South Africa 6.6%, Russia 6.5%, US 6.1%, China 4.2% (2012)

Imports:
$2.42 billion (2013 est.)

Imports - commodities:
food, petroleum products, semimanufactures, consumer goods, transportation equipment

Imports - partners:
South Africa 27%, China 16.6%, India 8.7%, Zambia 8.5%, Tanzania 5.1%, US 4.3% (2012)

Current account balance
- $280.1 million (2013 est.)

Debt - external:
$1.556 billion (31 December 2013 est.)

Economic aid - recipient:

$575.3 million (2005)

Foreign direct investment - inflow
$129.5 million (2014)

Currency:
1 Malawian kwacha (MK) = 100 tambala

Exchange rates:
Malawian kwachas per US dollar -730.00 (20/June/2016), 460.00 (20/Jan/2015), 360.00 (6/Feb/2013), 165.961 (1/Sep/2011), 145.179 (2009), 135.96 (2006), 108.894 (2005), 108.898 (2004), 97.433 (2003), 76.687 (2002)

Fiscal year:
1 July - 30 June

See also
 Transportation in Malawi
 List of companies based in Malawi
 Science and technology in Malawi
 Economy of Mozambique
 Economy of South Africa
 Economy of Botswana
 The International Monetary Fund and Malawi
 United Nations Economic Commission for Africa

References

Further reading
Anthony and Doreen Young, A Geography of Malawi, Second edition. Evans Brothers, Limited, London (1978)

External links
 Official site -  Ministry of Finance of Malawi
 
 MBendi Malawi overview
 Malawi latest trade data on ITC Trade Map

 
Malawi
Malawi